The 2019 EADC Tour series consisted of 6 darts tournaments on the 2019 PDC Pro Tour.

February

EADC Tour 1
EADC Tour 1 was contested on Saturday 23 February 2019 at the Omega Plaza Business Center in Moscow.

EADC Tour 2
EADC Tour 2 was contested on Saturday 23 February 2019 at the Omega Plaza Business Center in Moscow.

EADC Tour 3
EADC Tour 3 was contested on Sunday 24 February 2019 at the Omega Plaza Business Center in Moscow.

April

EADC Tour 4
EADC Tour 4 was contested on Saturday 27 April 2019 at the Omega Plaza Business Center in Moscow.

EADC Tour 5
EADC Tour 5 was contested on Saturday 27 April 2019 at the Omega Plaza Business Center in Moscow.

EADC Tour 6
EADC Tour 6 was contested on Sunday 28 April 2019 at the Omega Plaza Business Center in Moscow.

References

2019 in darts
2019 PDC Pro Tour